Gahnia marquisensis is a tussock-forming perennial in the family Cyperaceae, that is native to parts of the Marquesas Islands.

References

marquisensis
Plants described in 1931
Flora of the Marquesas Islands
Taxa named by Forest B.H. Brown